Starlight is a six-issue limited series from Image Comics, written by Mark Millar  with art by Goran Parlov.

Publication history
The 6-issue limited series which ran from March 2014 to October 2014.

Premise
Forty years ago, Duke McQueen was the space hero who saved the universe. But then he came back home, got married, had kids, and grew old. Now his children have left and his wife has died, leaving him alone with nothing except his memories...until a call comes from a distant world asking him back for his final and greatest adventure.

Film
In 2013 and 2014, The Hollywood Reporter reported that 20th Century Fox would produce the Starlight film with Gary Whitta penning the script. In 2015, Millar told JoBlo that the film was his next project. On April 12, 2021, Deadline reports that Joe Cornish will write and direct the film for 20th Century Studios.

Notes

2014 comics debuts
Comics by Mark Millar